The Spanish group Mecano released six studio albums, one live album, nine compilation albums, five video albums and more than 40 singles. In their career, it is estimated that Mecano has sold 25 million albums worldwide.

Albums

Studio albums

Live albums

Compilation albums

Video albums

Singles

Notes

References

Discographies of Spanish artists
Pop music group discographies
Rock music group discographies
New wave discographies